Nikolaos Bacharidis (born 20 October 1976) is a Greek former footballer who played as a defender.

Club career
Bacharidis is "flag" for the Panthrakikos F.C. He was captain for many years. He played nine years (2001–2010) in six levels, from the lowest regional league up to the Super League Greece. He retired after the 2009–2010 season's end.

Career statistics

References

External links

Panthraxstats
Insports
Guardian Football

1979 births
Living people
Greek footballers
Panthrakikos F.C. players
Association football defenders
People from Rhodope (regional unit)
Footballers from Eastern Macedonia and Thrace